Mount Shirshov is a small mountain lying 3 miles (4.8 km) northeast of Mount Selwood in the Tula Mountains, Enderby Land. The mountain was visited by geologists of the Soviet Antarctic Expedition of 1961-62 who named it for P.P. Shirshov, a Soviet polar explorer.

Mountains of Enderby Land